Münire Sultan ("brightness" or "brilliant"; 5 April 1880 – 7 October 1939) was an Ottoman princess, the daughter of Şehzade Ahmed Kemaleddin, the son of Sultan Abdulmejid I.

Early life
Münire Sultan was born on 5 April 1880 in the Dolmabahçe Palace. Her father was Şehzade Ahmed Kemaleddin, and her mother was Fatma Sezadil Hanım. She was named in honor of her paternal aunt, Münire Sultan, her father's full sister. She was the second child born to her father and mother. She had a sister Atiyetullah Sultan, two years elder then her, who died as a child. She was the granddaughter of Sultan Abdulmejid I and Verdicenan Kadın.

Marriage
In 1907, Abdul Hamid arranged her marriage to Mehmed Salih Pasha, son of Grand Vizier Hayreddin Pasha the Tunisian, who was one of Sultan Abdulmejid's grand viziers. The marriage took place on 10 January 1907 in the Yıldız Palace. The two together had a son, Sultanzade Ahmed Kemaleddin Bey, born on 18 June 1908 in the Nişantaşı Palace. Salih Pasha was accused of being in the assassination of the grand vizier General Mahmud Şevket Pasha and was condemned to death in 1913. Münire and her mother Sezadil solicited Sultan Mehmed V to not sign the death sentence, but the sultan signed the death without any objection, and so Salih Pasha was hanged on 11 June 1913.

Exile and death
At the exile of the imperial family in March 1924, Münire Sultan and her son settled firstly in Tunisia where they lived for four years and later settled in Nice, France. Here the two had very few financial means. And she was not around much, as she was still mourning the death of her husband. She died on 7 October 1939 at aged fifty nine, and was buried there.

Honours
 Order of the House of Osman
 Order of the Medjidie, Jeweled
 Order of Charity, 1st Class
 Hicaz Demiryolu Medal in Gold

Issue

Ancestry

References

Source

1880 births
1939 deaths
Royalty from Istanbul
19th-century Ottoman princesses
20th-century Ottoman princesses